The following television stations operate on virtual channel 35 in the United States:

 K20JL-D in Ellensburg, etc., Washington
 K25JO-D in Altus, Oklahoma
 K34NB-D in Lubbock, Texas
 K35JN-D in Duluth, Minnesota
 K35KC-D in Great Falls, Montana
 K35KH-D in Walker, Minnesota
 K35KX-D in Topeka, Kansas
 K35LA-D in Palm Springs, California
 K35MF-D in Big Spring, Texas
 K35OX-D in Selma, Alabama
 K35OY-D in Columbia, Missouri
 K35PO-D in Bismarck, North Dakota
 KAPP in Yakima, Washington
 KCBA in Salinas, California
 KCFT-CD in Anchorage, Alaska
 KESE-LD in Yuma, Arizona
 KEUV-LD in Eureka, California
 KFGX-LD in Fargo, North Dakota
 KFKZ-LD in Cedar Falls, Iowa
 KFPH-CD in Phoenix, Arizona
 KGLR-LD in Sparks, Nevada
 KHBA-LD in Spokane, Washington
 KHFW-LD in Dallas, Texas
 KJBO-LD in Wichita Falls, Texas
 KJBW-LD in Paragould, Arkansas
 KJNM-LD in Fayetteville, Arkansas
 KMCF-LD in Visalia, California
 KMYS in Kerrville, Texas
 KORK-CD in Portland, Oregon
 KRAH-CD in Paris, Arkansas
 KRSU-TV in Claremore, Oklahoma
 KRZG-CD in McAllen, Texas
 KTAV-LD in Los Angeles, California
 KTXC-LD in Amarillo, Texas
 KUOK in Woodward, Oklahoma
 KVTE-LD in Las Vegas, Nevada
 KXSH-LD in Rochester, Minnesota
 KXTF in Twin Falls, Idaho
 KYUU-LD in Boise, Idaho
 W33ER-D in Augusta, Georgia
 W35BB-D in Dublin, Georgia
 W35CS-D in Ocean City, Maryland
 W35DH-D in Greenville, Florida
 W35DI-D in Roanoke, West Virginia
 W35DZ-D in Algood, Tennessee
 W35EC-D in Jennings, Florida
 WAMS-LD in Minster-New Bremen, Ohio
 WCTZ-LD in Bowling Green, Kentucky
 WCZS-LD in Chambersburg, Pennsylvania
 WFBN-LD in Rockford, Illinois
 WFCU-LD in Augusta, Georgia
 WFGX in Fort Walton Beach, Florida
 WGCB-LD in Hinesville-Richmond, Georgia
 WGVU-TV in Grand Rapids, Michigan
 WHCT-LD in Hartford, New Haven, Connecticut
 WIPL in Lewiston, Maine
 WJDW-LD in Tazewell, Virginia
 WKHA in Hazard, Kentucky
 WKMA-TV in Madisonville, Kentucky
 WLOO in Vicksburg, Mississippi
 WOCV-CD in Cleveland, Ohio
 WOFL in Orlando, Florida
 WOHL-CD in Lima, Ohio
 WPBY-LD in Lafayette, Indiana
 WPNM-LD in Liepsic, Ohio
 WPPT in Philadelphia, Pennsylvania
 WPXM-TV in Miami, Florida
 WPXU-TV in Jacksonville, North Carolina
 WRCZ-LD in Ocala, Florida
 WRLH-TV in Richmond, Virginia
 WRLK-TV in Columbia, South Carolina
 WSEE-TV in Erie, Pennsylvania
 WSLF-LD in Port St. Lucie, Florida
 WSPF-CD in St. Petersburg, Florida
 WWKH-CD in Uniontown, Pennsylvania
 WWLF-LD in Syracuse, New York
 WWTO-TV in La Salle, Illinois
 WYLN-LP in Hazleton, Pennsylvania
 WZCH-LD in Myrtle Beach, South Carolina

The following stations formerly operated on virtual channel 35, but are no longer licensed:
 K35DG-D in La Jolla, California
 K41JF-D in Hagerman, Idaho
 KIDB-LD in Sweetwater, Texas
 KZMB-LD in Enid, Oklahoma
 WCTX-CD in Virginia Beach, Virginia
 WSWH-LD in Decatur, Alabama
 WUCV-LD in Florence, South Carolina

References

35 virtual